STEAM fields are the areas of science, technology, engineering, the arts, and mathematics. STEAM is designed to integrate STEM subjects with arts subjects into various relevant education disciplines. These programs aim to teach students innovation, to think critically, and use engineering or technology in imaginative designs or creative approaches to real-world problems while building on students' mathematics and science base. STEAM programs add arts to STEM curriculum by drawing on reasoning and design principles, and encouraging creative solutions.

STEAM in children's media 

Sesame Streets 43rd season continues to focus on STEM but finds ways to integrate art. They state: "This helps make learning STEM concepts relevant and enticing to young children by highlighting how artists use STEM knowledge to enhance their art or solve problems. It also provides context for the importance of STEM knowledge in careers in the arts (e.g. musician, painter, sculptor, and dancer)."
MGA Entertainment created a S.T.E.A.M. based franchise Project Mc2.

Other uses of the STEAM acronym 

Other meanings of the "A" that have been promoted include agriculture, architecture, and applied mathematics. 
The Rhode Island School of Design has a STEM to STEAM program and at one point maintained an interactive map that showed global STEAM initiatives.  Relevant organizations were able to add themselves to the map, though it is no longer available at the location stated in press releases. John Maeda, (2008 to 2013 president of Rhode Island School of Design) has been a champion in bringing the initiative to the political forums of educational policy.
Some programs offer STEAM from a base focus like mathematics and science. 
SteamHead is a non-profit organization that promotes innovation and accessibility in education, focusing on STEAM fields.
 Wolf Trap's Institute of Education, as part of a $1.5 million Department of Education grant, trains and places teaching artists into preschool and kindergarten classrooms. The artists collaborate with the teachers to integrate math and science into the arts.
 American Lisa La Bonte, CEO of the Arab Youth Venture Foundation based in the United Arab Emirates, uses the STEAM acronym, but her work does not include arts integration. Starting in 2007, La Bonte created and ran high profile free public STEAM programs having added an A for "inspired STEM", with the A standing for Aeronautics, Aviation, Astronomy, Aerospace, Ad Astra! and using all things "air and space" as a hook for youth to embark on greater experimentation, studies, and careers in the region's burgeoning space-related industries. One of AYVF's best-known programs, "STEAM@TheMall", served over 200,000 its first two years at the most popular shopping malls and provided free weekend activity stations such as Mars robotics, science experiments, SkyLab portable planetarium, art/design, and creative writing. In 2008, Sharjah Sheikha Maisa kicked off the "Design booth for youth for Al Ain Summer S.T.E.A.M. funded by the Foundation created by the Crown Prince of Abu Dhabi". In 2010, the American Association of Arts & Sciences (AAAS) included a chapter on AYVF's most popular STEAM program in its book, Building Mathematical and Scientific Talent in the Broader Middle East and North Africa (BMENA) Region.

Examples of STEAM jobs 
Among others, careers in STEAM include:

 Animator
 Agriculturist
 Archaeologist
 Architect
 Astronaut
 Astrophysicist
 Audio developer
 Biomedical engineer
 Broadcast technician
 Civil engineering
 Conservators
 Electronic engineering
 Fashion designer
 Forensic psychologist
 Graphic designer
 Interior designer
 Mechanical engineer
 Media artist
 Medical illustrator
 Modern urban planner
 Orthopedic technologist
 Photographer
 Pilot
 Product designer
 Scientific imaging
 Teacher
 Sound engineer
 Video game designer
 Website/app designer

See also 
 Arts-based training
 STEM fields

References

External links
What is STEAM? (fine arts-based)
STEM to STEAM
STEAM Connect
The Arts Are Not a Luxury
ISEA2012 Machine Wilderness: Special Media-N edition
The STEAM Journal (Academic journal)

Education policy
Science education
Engineering education
Mathematics education
Visual arts education
Design